Georgy Markovich Korniyenko (also Kornienko; , 13 February 1925 – 10 May 2006) was a Soviet diplomat.

He joined the Soviet Ministry of Foreign Affairs in 1949 and later became an attaché at the Soviet Embassy in Washington, D.C. during the 1962 Cuban Missile Crisis. Then in 1964 he was assigned to head the Soviet Foreign Ministry's American desk. He became a deputy to Soviet Foreign Minister Andrei Gromyko in 1975 and the first deputy two years later.

He was instrumental in developing Soviet policy toward the United States and setting the agenda for U.S.-Soviet disarmament talks in the 1970s and the 1980s. He is known to have clashed on occasion with other members of the Soviet elite on foreign policy issues. In 1983, when a Soviet fighter shot down a Korean airliner intruding into Soviet airspace, killing all 269 people on board, Korniyenko opposed the official Kremlin course on the incident and futilely urged the Communist Party leadership to release more information about it to avoid international isolation.

He was one of the few Soviet leaders who opposed the 1979 Soviet invasion of Afghanistan. He was awarded the Hero of Socialist Labour in 1985, one of the highest awards in the Soviet Union. He died after a lengthy unspecified illness.

References
Georgy Korniyenko; helped set agenda for US-Soviet talks at The Boston Globe

1925 births
2006 deaths
20th-century diplomats
People from Mykolaiv Oblast
People from Odessa Governorate
Central Committee of the Communist Party of the Soviet Union members
Tenth convocation members of the Soviet of the Union
Eleventh convocation members of the Soviet of the Union
Heroes of Socialist Labour
Recipients of the Order of Friendship of Peoples
Recipients of the Order of Honour (Russia)
Recipients of the Order of Lenin
Recipients of the Order of the Red Banner of Labour
Cold War diplomats
Soviet diplomats
Soviet expatriates in the United States
Burials in Troyekurovskoye Cemetery